The pond loach (Misgurnus anguillicaudatus), also known as the Dojo loach, oriental weatherloach or oriental weatherfish, is a freshwater fish in the loach family Cobitidae.  They are native to East Asia but are also popular as an aquarium fish and introduced elsewhere in Asia and to Europe, America and Australia. The alternate name weather loach is shared with several other Cobitidae, including the other members of the genus Misgurnus and the spotted weather loach (Cobitis taenia, commonly known as spined loach). This term comes from their ability to detect changes in barometric pressure and react with frantic swimming or standing on end. This is because before a storm the barometric pressure changes, and this is known to make these fish more active. The pond loach also comes in a variety of colors, such as pink, orange, albino and gray.

Description
Like many other loaches, pond loaches are slender and eel/snake-like. They can vary in colour from yellow to olive green, to a common light brown or grey with lighter undersides. The mouth of the loach is surrounded by three sets of barbels. It uses them to sift through silt or pebbles to find food. It also uses them to dig under gravel and sand to conceal itself out of nervousness or defence unlike the other loaches who use the spines beneath the eyes.

The fish are bottom-dwelling scavengers, feeding mainly on organic material such as algae. Pond loaches are omnivorous and may also feed on tubifex worms and other small aquatic organisms. By producing a layer of mucus to keep themselves damp they can survive short periods of desiccation. They are very hardy fish that can live in poor quality water.

While these loaches tend to be hardier than more sensitive species, the should still be kept in pristine water conditions to ensure their health and flourish within the home aquarium or pond. These loaches prefer a soft,sandy,smooth stone, fine gravel substrate, or bare bottomed tank as opposed to any form of rocks or rough gravel, which have been known to damage the sensitive barbels and skin.

Physiology 
Unlike most other fishes, the pond loach can burrow into and hide in soft substrates, breathe atmospheric air through enteral respiration if necessary, and survive for long periods of time outside of the water. For the pond loach to survive on land for extended periods of time, it has physiological adaptations to reduce toxic ammonia concentrations in the body and maintain homeostasis and normal functioning of tissues. When on land, the pond loach can suppress protein breakdown and catabolism (which avoids creating ammonia), switch to partial amino catabolism (which creates non-toxic alanine instead of ammonia), convert ammonia to non-toxic glutamine, and get rid of ammonia by excreting it as NH3 gas. The pond loach is also relatively insensitive to ammonia, though it is not known how pond loach tissues, especially the heart and brain, are able to function at ammonia concentrations that would be lethal for other species. One hypothesis is that the pond loach may maintain normal brain cell functioning by altering the sensitivity and specificity of receptors in the brain for potassium ions, which otherwise would be overwhelmed by ammonia.

In the aquarium

 

Pond loaches are active, peaceful, and hardy fish that are sometimes used as starter fish in an aquarium. They can be "friendly" towards humans, allowing physical contact and hand feeding. They are extremely peaceful. They get along well with goldfish. 

The loaches will be more active given more space and greater numbers. Solitary pond loaches tend to spend much of their time hiding. They will spend a lot of time hiding or staying still, but should be given a place to stay which will have cover and shade. Tank decorations that they can swim through and driftwood both work great for this. Due to their jumping ability the average cover should be secured with tape or other barriers. Also, they may even travel up tubes and take up residence in filters, so check there if your pond loach does not show up for roll call one day. Pond loaches enjoy digging and burrowing themselves in the substrate of their tank, so make sure that your substrate is fine enough for them to dig in. If you keep live plants in your tank, they will be uprooted by the loaches, so it is a good idea to weight your plants. The pond loach is also peculiar in that it will sometimes bury itself in the substrate during times of stress. This often surprises new owners, as the fish will "disappear" shortly after introduction to the tank only to "reappear" later.

Because of their appetite for snails, these loaches can help alleviate snail infestations in tropical fish tanks, though many have reported that while pond loaches do eat snails, they do not eat them at a fast enough rate to deal with an infestation.

The fish prefer a pH of 6.5-8.0 but will tolerate far more acidic conditions even for extended amounts of time with little negative reaction. This makes the pond loach a great choice for first-time aquariums and for those who want a hardy fish tank able to withstand a few mistakes. This fish should be kept in groups of at least three, as they like to be in physical contact with each other and feel each other with their barbels when they rest.

Due to their hardiness, they can survive in low and high-temperature extremes. Though they can survive in a wide temperature range they thrive best in a tank temperature of 68 to 72 degrees Fahrenheit, 15 to 25 degrees Celsius. Even though Dojo Loaches have the unique ability to easily adapt tank temperature should not fluctuate much throughout the day as this can easily cause them stress. Other than water temperature Dojo Loaches are not extremely sensitive to the water chemistry of their tank. This fish can thrive in pH levels of anywhere from 6.0 to 8.0. The Dojo Loach should be kept in cool water temperatures with a pH level of slightly acidic to slightly alkaline to live a healthy life span.

There are other varieties bred from captivity like the gold strain and the peppered strain (not to be confused with the peppered loach). Sometimes the pond loach (especially the golden variety) is mistaken for the kuhli loach. The kuhli, however, likes warm tropical temperatures, will tolerate more acidic conditions, and matures at a much smaller . Although these two species have numerous differentiating traits, individual kuhli and pond loaches may resemble each other while young and at the usual age and size of what most fish stores market.

As food
The pond loach is a common culinary fish in East Asia, raised on a large scale in fish farming.  According to FAO, M. anguillicaudatus was 30th on the list of most important species in aquaculture, in terms of total weight produced in 2018.

In Korea, chueo-tang (loach soup) is made with pond loach.

Range

Native range
According to the US Geological Survey, M. anguillicaudatus is native to eastern Asia from Siberia to Northern Vietnam, including Japan.

Introduced range

Australia
Imported into Australia in the 1960s as an aquarium species, M. anguillicaudatus was first detected in the wild in 1980, and its further importation was banned in 1986. M. anguillicaudatus is a declared Class 1 noxious species in New South Wales, as it has become established in several NSW rivers. including the Murray River extending downstream into South Australia.

United States
Between 2010 and 2020 M. anguillicaudatus was found in 10 states of the United States including Alabama and Georgia. The Georgia find was in November 2020 in McNutt Creek in Athens on the border between Clarke and Oconee. This indicates eastern Georgia is environmentally suitable for it, and so if not stopped M. anguillicaudatus is expected to spread through the area. That could include the downstream and adjacent rivers, the Middle Oconee, the North Oconee, the Oconee River itself, the Ocmulgee, and the Altamaha.

As of November 2021, according to the U.S. Geological Survey, this species has also been captured from the wild in Illinois (including many captures in the Chicago area), New York, Ohio, Michigan, Washington, Oregon, Maryland, New Jersey, North Carolina, Louisiana, and southern California.

See also
 Loach
 European weather loach
 Dojō nabe

References

Bibliography
 
 
 How to Keep Your New Weather Loach

External links
 GLANSIS Species FactSheet

Misgurnus
Commercial fish
Freshwater fish of China
Freshwater fish of Japan
Fish of Korea
Fish of Russia
Freshwater fish of Taiwan
Fish of Vietnam
Taxa named by Theodore Edward Cantor
Fish described in 1842